The 1962–63 DDR-Oberliga was the 14th season of the DDR-Oberliga, the first tier of league football in East Germany.

The league was contested by fourteen teams.  SC Motor Jena won the championship, the club's first-ever national East German championship. The club would go on to win two more, then under the name of FC Carl Zeiss Jena. 

Peter Ducke of SC Motor Jena was the league's top scorer with 19 goals. For the first time the title East German Footballer of the year was awarded, going to Manfred Kaiser of SC Wismut Karl-Marx-Stadt.

On the strength of the 1962–63 title Motor Jena qualified for the 1963–64 European Cup where the club was knocked out by Dinamo Bucharest in the preliminary round. Seventh-placed club BSG Motor Zwickau qualified for the 1963–64 European Cup Winners' Cup as the seasons FDGB-Pokal winner and was knocked out by MTK Budapest in the second round after having received a bye in the first round.

Table									
The 1962–63 season saw two newly promoted clubs, SC Karl-Marx-Stadt and Dynamo Dresden.

Results

References

Sources

External links
 Das Deutsche Fussball Archiv  Historic German league tables

Ober
1962-63
1